Óscar Leandro Ribera (born 10 February 1992) is a Bolivian professional footballer who plays for Bolivian Primera División side Club Independiente Petrolero and the Bolivia national team. On 23 March, 2017 Ribera played in a 2018 FIFA World Cup qualification game for Bolivia away against Colombia.

References

1992 births
Living people
Bolivian footballers
Bolivia international footballers
Association football midfielders
Universitario de Sucre footballers
Oriente Petrolero players
Club Bolívar players
Sport Boys Warnes players
2021 Copa América players